Narin may refer to:

 Narin, County Donegal, a village on the west coast of County Donegal in the Republic of Ireland
 Narin, Slovenia, a village in the Pivka Municipality in Slovenia
 Narin (Afghanistan), district of Baghlan Province

See also
 Narine, a given name and surname